HD 179886 (HR 7289) is a binary star located in the southern constellation Telescopium. It has a combined apparent magnitude of 5.37, making it faintly visible to the naked eye if viewed under ideal conditions.

As of 2018, the two stars have a separation of  along a position angle of  

The brighter component has a stellar classification of K3 III, indicating that the object is an ageing K-type giant. Models show it to be on the red giant branch, a stage of stellar evolution where the star is fusing hydrogen in a shell around an inert core of helium.

References

K-type giants
Telescopium (constellation)
179886
094712
7289
Telescopii, 51
Durchmusterung objects
Double stars